Denis Kilbride (September 1848 – 24 October 1924) was an Irish nationalist politician, who as member of the Irish Parliamentary Party represented South Kerry (1887–1895), and North Galway (1895–1900) and South Kildare (1903–1918) as a Member of Parliament (MP) in the House of Commons of the United Kingdom of Great Britain and Ireland.

He was educated at Clongowes Wood. He was evicted, along with other subtenants of the 5th Marquess of Lansdowne, was evicted from his  holding during the Luggacurran evictions, Stradbally, County Laois, in March 1887.

Kilbride's rent was 760 pounds a year, although the holding was valued at only 450. Although he was a large tenant, he and other tenants adopted the Plan of Campaign.

To raise awareness of the evictions, Kilbride travelled with William O'Brien to Canada, where the Marquess of Lansdowne was governor general, and the USA.

In August 1902, he was charged under the Offences against the Person Act 1861 with incitement to murder - during the course of a speech against an eviction - of Major-General Devinish Meares. That December, he was found guilty and sentenced to eight months' imprisonment. After the passing of the Evicted Tenants Act, 1908, some of this holding, but not his house, was returned to him.

He died at his residence in Luggacurran in 1924 aged 76 and was buried in Clopook cemetery.

References

External links
 
 

1848 births
1924 deaths
Anti-Parnellite MPs
Irish Parliamentary Party MPs
Members of the Parliament of the United Kingdom for County Galway constituencies (1801–1922)
Members of the Parliament of the United Kingdom for County Kerry constituencies (1801–1922)
Members of the Parliament of the United Kingdom for County Kildare constituencies (1801–1922)
People educated at Clongowes Wood College
Politicians from County Laois
UK MPs 1886–1892
UK MPs 1892–1895
UK MPs 1895–1900
UK MPs 1900–1906
UK MPs 1906–1910
UK MPs 1910
UK MPs 1910–1918